Emeka Ogbugh (born 22 February 1990) is a Nigerian footballer who plays for Mouloudia Oujda, as a striker.

References

1990 births
Living people
Nigerian footballers
Nigeria international footballers
Heartland F.C. players
Rivers United F.C. players
Association football forwards
Place of birth missing (living people)
Saif SC players
Nigeria A' international footballers
2018 African Nations Championship players
Nigerian expatriate sportspeople in Morocco
Nigerian expatriate footballers
Expatriate footballers in Morocco